Academic grading in Svalbard is performed at the University Centre in Svalbard and at the Longyearbyen School.

The University Center of Svalbard use the same university grading system as in mainland Norway:

There are no universities in the Russian-speaking areas of Svalbard.

References

Education in Svalbard
Grading in Svalbard